Lakva Sim, (born March 10, 1972 as Dugarbaataryn Lkhagva), is a Mongolian former professional boxer who competed from 1995 to 2005. He is a world champion in two weight classes, having held the WBA super-featherweight title in 1999 and the WBA lightweight title in 2004. He is also the first Mongolian boxer to capture a world title.

Professional career

He turned professional in 1995 and won the WBA super featherweight by defeating Takanori Hatakeyama in 1999. In that same year he later lost the belt to Jong-Kwon Baek, and in 2002 challenged Yodsanan Sor Nanthachai for the vacant WBA super featherweight title, but lost by decision. He later moved up to lightweight and in 2004 fought Miguel Callist for the vacant WBA lightweight title, winning by TKO. Sim was outboxed and lost his belt in his next fight against Juan Diaz. In 2005, he upset Ebo Elder by a late round TKO.

Professional boxing record

See also
List of WBA world champions

References

External links
 

|-

1972 births
Living people
Sportspeople from Ulaanbaatar
World lightweight boxing champions
World super-featherweight boxing champions
Boxers at the 1994 Asian Games
Mongolian male boxers
Asian Games competitors for Mongolia
20th-century Mongolian people